Carl Gustafsson (born October 23, 1989) is a retired Colombian-born Swedish ice hockey player. He came up through the youth ranks of Djurgårdens IF. He played for several Swedish HockeyAllsvenskan clubs, among them IF Troja/Ljungby.

Career statistics

References

External links

1989 births
Almtuna IS players
Black ice hockey players
Colombian ice hockey players
Djurgårdens IF Hockey players
Huddinge IK players
IF Troja/Ljungby players
Living people
Rögle BK players
Rosenborg IHK players
Swedish ice hockey left wingers
Swedish people of Colombian descent